The Squan Song Stakes is a race for Thoroughbred horses held in early November at Laurel Park in Maryland.  The ungraded stakes race is open to three-year-olds, is run at one mile on the dirt, and offers a purse of $75,000.

This race is named for Squan Song (born 1981), who was a four-time Maryland Bred champion, from 1984 to 1987 and earned "Horse-of-the-Year" honors in 1985. A winner of 18 of her 36 career starts, with 12 placements (ten in stakes races), the mare earned $898,444, placing her fourth on the all-time list of top Maryland-bred money winners at the time of her retirement. She was sold by her breeder Linda Green, for $125,000 as a weanling at Keeneland.

Squan Song campaigned under the colors of owners Bob Brennan's Due ProcessStable, winning a total of 14 stakes races, including the Grade 2 Cotillion Handicap at Philadelphia Park, the Rare Treat Stakes and the Affectionately Handicap at Aqueduct Racetrack. She set track records for a mile and one sixteenth in the Meadowlands Racetrack's Honey Bee Handicap and in Garden State Park Racetrack's Haddonfield Handicap.

Records
Speed record:
 7 furlong - 1:23.00 - Gazillion (2002)
  miles - 1:50.00 - Wait for the Lady (1990)

Most wins by a jockey:
 4 - Alberto Delgado  (1988, 1991, 1992, 2009)
 3 - Jeremy Rose   (2002, 2003, 2006)

Most wins by a trainer:
 3 - Richard W. Small (2004, 2005, 2007)

Winners of the Squan Song Stakes since 1988

See also
 Squan Song Stakes "top three finishers" and starters
 Laurel Park Racecourse

References

External links
Laurel Park racetrack

Triple Crown Prep Races
Laurel Park Racecourse
Horse races in Maryland
Recurring sporting events established in 1988
1988 establishments in Maryland